Originally called Guoyuan by local people, Dongba Park  is the largest suburban public park in Beijing. It covers a territory that is 3 times larger in size than the Forbidden City. The park is located in Chaoyang District, near the eastern segment of 5th Ring Road. There are hundreds of plant species in the park, including many fruits, such as peach, cherry, pear, apricot and jujube. In certain months, visitors are allowed to pick those fruits for free.

Parks in Beijing